John Charles Fuller (born March 3, 1946) is a former professional American football player. He played eight seasons as a safety in the National Football League (NFL) for the San Francisco 49ers, New Orleans Saints and Chicago Bears.

As a collegian, Fuller made all-conference three years and as a senior was named a small college all-American. He also lettered in track four years and was a qualifier in the decathlon for the 1968 U. S. Olympic trials.

Fuller was an assistant coach at Lamar University for six years, leaving there in 1986. In 1992, he became head football coach at Mendocino College.

Fuller and his wife, Sharon, have two sons.

References
 

 

1946 births
Living people
American football safeties
San Francisco 49ers players
New Orleans Saints players
Lamar University alumni
Lamar Cardinals football players